Arthur Knapp Engle (born December 19, 1965) is an American former professional tennis player.

A left-handed player from Boston, Engle attended Harvard University and competed in varsity tennis. He earned ITA All-American honors for doubles in 1985 and was named the Region I Senior Player of the Year in 1988.

Engle, now an attorney, featured briefly on the professional tour after Harvard and had a best singles ranking of 287. He was a semi-finalist at the 1989 Bossonnens Challenger and made two qualifying draw appearances at Wimbledon. In his only Grand Prix main draw he reached the doubles second round of the 1989 U.S. Pro Tennis Championships.

ATP Challenger finals

Doubles: 1 (0–1)

References

External links
 
 

1965 births
Living people
American male tennis players
Harvard Crimson men's tennis players
Tennis players from Boston